Roinville may refer to:
 Roinville, Eure-et-Loir, a commune of the Centre region of France
 Roinville, Essonne, a commune of the Île-de-France region